Burangulovo (Buranğol) is a rural locality (a selo) in Kidryachevsky Selsoviet, Davlekanovsky District, Bashkortostan, Russia. The population was 309 as of 2010. There are 3 streets.

Geography 
Burangulovo is located 42 km northwest of Davlekanovo (the district's administrative centre) by road. Kidryachevo is the nearest rural locality.

References 

Rural localities in Davlekanovsky District